Protodictya is a genus of flies in the family Sciomyzidae, the marsh flies or snail-killing flies.

Species
P. nubilipennis Wulp, 1897
P. apicalis Steyskal, 1950
P. bidentata Marinoni & Knutson, 1992
P. brasiliensis Schiner, 1868
P. chilensis Malloch, 1933
P. guttularis Wiedemann, 1830
P. iguassu Steyskal, 1950
P. lilloana Steyskal, 1953

References

Sciomyzidae
Sciomyzoidea genera